Thoroddsen is a common Icelandic family name. It may refer to:

Ásdís Thoroddsen (born 1959), Icelandic actress and film director
Björn Thoroddsen, Icelandic musician, guitar player
Emil Thoroddsen (1898–1944), Icelandic composer, playwright and critic
Gunnar Thoroddsen (1910–1983), Icelandic politician, Prime Minister of Iceland from 1980 to 1983
Halldóra K. Thoroddsen (1950–2020), Icelandic writer
Jón Thoroddsen elder ( 1818–1868), Icelandic author
Jón Thoroddsen junior (1898–1924), Icelandic author.
Skúli Thoroddsen, Icelandic politician and judge
Sigurður S. Thoroddsen (1902–1983), Icelandic politician
Þorvaldur Thoroddsen (1855–1921), Icelandic geologist and geographer
Theodóra Thoroddsen, Icelandic poet

Icelandic-language surnames